Doyle: Spotlight is a comic based on the television series Angel. This title, along with the others in IDW Publishing's Spotlight series, was collected in the Angel: Spotlight trade paperback. The book focuses on the character of Allen Francis Doyle.

Story description

Summary
Set just before the very first episode of Angel, this story focuses on Doyle as he wanders the streets of L.A., depressed and isolated. After receiving a vision about a young woman he knows named Misty, showing that she is in grave danger, he rushes to try to save her from a grisly fate.

Expanded overview
Doyle, half-human, half-demon, walks the streets of Los Angeles, reflecting on the state of his life. His life has taken a turn for the worse; he's lost his job, his wife, and his happiness. For several days, he has been experiencing intense headaches. Doyle comes across a friend named Misty. She asks if he's been "seeing stuff" again, and points out that he's drunk. As she leaves, Doyle reminds Misty that she owes him five dollars.

Doyle thinks about his visions, and how The Powers That Be tell him that they're real. The visions began after a Brachen demon named Lucas - one of Doyle's own kind - came to him to warn him about something called The Scourge. Doyle turned down the demon's request for help, and then had his first vision. Doyle investigated, and found the Brachen demon's body - the vision had come true.

Suddenly, Doyle has a new vision. He sees Misty, strung up on a hook in a room, with a sign outside the window with the visible letters H-O-T-E. Doyle immediately decides to find out if the vision is true. After wandering the streets for some time, he thinks he spots Misty in a crowd. He chases her down, but it's not her. Discouraged, Doyle continues walking.

Finally, Doyle finds a hotel sign that resembles the one he glimpsed in the vision. He rushes inside, passing a woman with a duffel bag on his way up the stairs. He picks the door he believes Misty is behind and kicks it open, to find that he is too late: Misty has been killed and disemboweled. Doyle takes down Misty's body, and realizes that the woman in the stairwell must be her murderer. Doyle rushes outside and follows her.

As Doyle watches the woman enter a building, he has another vision, this time of a girl in a Santa Monica coffee shop named Tina. Doyle writes down the highlights of the vision, and sees a demon emerge from the building. Doyle morphs into his demonic appearance and knocks on the door. The woman he followed answers, and Doyle pushes his way in to see the human organ store within. Realizing that Brachens don't eat humans, the woman attacks Doyle with a meat cleaver. After a struggle, the woman leaps at Doyle, but he manages to dodge, and she crashes through a window, landing far below in an open construction site.

Doyle sets fire to the building containing the organ store and, thinking that he's no hero, resolves to track down someone that the Powers That Be have pointed him towards: Angel.

Writing and artwork

Cultural references
Roseanne: In this issue, a pedestrian calls out to Doyle saying, "Healy!...Mark?" Doyle responds with, "Sorry, bud. Got me confused with someone else." Glenn Quinn, who played Doyle, also played the character Mark Healy on the hit sitcom Roseanne.
Live Nude Girls: Another reference to Quinn, this time a 1995 movie starring Kim Cattrall.

Continuity

This story is set immediately before the Angel episode "City of", and contains a number of references to that episode. The vision of Tina that Doyle writes down is the very first mission he sends Angel on. The final page of the comic documents Doyle's first meeting with Angel, as seen in "City of."
Doyle turns down Lucas's request for help against The Scourge. In "Hero", Doyle sacrifices his life to stop The Scourge.

Canonical issues

Angel comics such as this one are not usually considered by fans as canonical. However, unlike fan fiction, overviews summarizing their story, written early in the writing process, were approved by both Fox and Joss Whedon (or his office), and the books were therefore later published as officially Buffy merchandise.

Reviews

Speed, Andrea, "Angel Spotlight: Doyle Review ", ComiXtreme.com (August 6, 2006).

Information
Idwpublishing.com - Early listing of the comic which is wrongly labelled as being released in May (actual date is July

References

External links

Angel (1999 TV series) comics
Comics by Jeff Mariotte